The Miss Perú 2008 was held on May 1, 2008. That year, only 16 candidates were competing for the national crown. The chosen winner represented Peru at the Miss Universe 2008 pageant which was held in Vietnam. The Miss Earth Perú would enter in Miss Earth 2008. The first runner up would enter in Miss Continente Americano 2008. The second runner up would in Miss Tourism World 2008.

Placements

Special Awards

 Best Regional Costume - Cuzco - Claudia Carrasco
 Miss Photogenic - Arequipa - Leslie Bejarano
 Miss Elegance - Cuzco - Claudia Carrasco
 Miss Body - USA Perú - Johanna Botta
 Best Hair - Arequipa - Leslie Bejarano
 Miss Congeniality - Ica - Tania Chau
 Most Beautiful Face - La Libertad - Giosiana Huby
 Best Smile - Amazonas - Viviana Guerrero Landa
 Miss Internet - Loreto - Giuliana Zevallos

Delegates

Amazonas - Viviana Guerrero
Arequipa - Leslie Bejarano Flores
Ayacucho - Luciana Higueras
Chiclayo - María Paola Chirinos
Cuzco - Claudia Carrasco
Ica - Tania Chau
La Libertad - Giosiana Huby Ceasar
Lambayeque - Vanessa Chanta

Loreto - Giuliana Zevallos
Piura - Karla Aguilar
Region Lima - Jimena Espinosa Vecco
San Martín - Diana Rodríguez
Tacna - Angela Ascuna
Trujillo - Karol Castillo
Tumbes - Raquel García Aguirre
USA Perú - Johanna Botta

Background Music

Opening Show - Bananarama - "Love In The First Degree"
Swimsuit Competition - Beyoncé & JAY Z - "Crazy In Love"
Evening Gown Competition – Boyzone - "Love Me For A Reason"

References

External links
Miss Peru '08

Miss Peru
2008 in Peru
2008 beauty pageants